Devosia neptuniae is a nitrogen-fixing bacteria that nodulates Neptunia natans. It is Gram-negative, strictly aerobic short rod-shaped and motile by a subpolar flagellum.  The type strain of D. neptuniae is LMG 21357T (CECT 5650T).

References

Further reading

Polacco, Joe C., and Christopher D. Todd. Ecological Aspects of Nitrogen Metabolism in Plants. John Wiley & Sons, 2011.

External links

LPSN
Type strain of Devosia neptuniae at BacDive -  the Bacterial Diversity Metadatabase

Hyphomicrobiales
Bacteria described in 2003